Clara Elena Ciocan (born 28 December 1978) is a Romanian diver. She competed at the 1992 Summer Olympics, the 1996 Summer Olympics and the 2000 Summer Olympics.

References

External links
 

1978 births
Living people
Romanian female divers
Olympic divers of Romania
Divers at the 1992 Summer Olympics
Divers at the 1996 Summer Olympics
Divers at the 2000 Summer Olympics
Sportspeople from Bacău